The discography of the English rock band Oasis consists of seven studio albums, two live albums, five compilation albums, six video albums, one extended play, twenty eight singles which includes one double single, nineteen promotional singles and thirty-six music videos. As of 2022, the band have sold over 70 million records worldwide, and been cited by Guinness World Records as the most successful act in the United Kingdom between the years 1995 and 2005. Oasis had 22 consecutive UK top 10 hits between 1994 and 2008. Oasis was formed in 1991 by vocalist Liam Gallagher, guitarist Paul "Bonehead" Arthurs, bassist Paul "Guigsy" McGuigan and drummer Tony McCarroll – they were later joined by guitarist and songwriter Noel Gallagher. The band signed to Creation Records in May 1993 and released their debut single "Supersonic" the following year; it peaked at number 31 in the United Kingdom. Follow-up singles "Shakermaker" and "Live Forever" became UK top 15 hits, with the latter also attaining success in the United States. Definitely Maybe, the band's debut studio album, topped the UK Albums Chart and went on to be certified eight times platinum by the British Phonographic Industry (BPI).
 
Oasis released their second studio album (What's the Story) Morning Glory? in October 1995. It was a huge commercial success, topping the charts in the UK and in multiple other countries, including Australia, Canada and Ireland. The album produced six singles, including the band's first UK number-one single "Some Might Say" and the international hits "Wonderwall" and "Don't Look Back in Anger". (What's the Story) Morning Glory? has sold over twenty-two million copies worldwide, which makes it one of the best-selling albums of all-time. The album was certified sixteen times platinum by the BPI and is the fifth best-selling album (third best-selling studio album) of all time in the UK, with sales of over 4.9 million copies in the country. The band's third studio album Be Here Now was released to great anticipation in August 1997. While the album topped the charts in several countries and became the fastest-selling album in British history, it failed to match the commercial success of Morning Glory, ultimately selling around ten million copies worldwide. Two of the album's singles, "D'You Know What I Mean?" and "All Around the World", peaked at number one in the UK.

Oasis' fourth studio album Standing on the Shoulder of Giants was released in February 2000, reaching number one in the UK and Ireland. Though not as commercially successful as its predecessors, Standing on the Shoulder of Giants managed to receive a double platinum certification from the BPI and featured three UK top five singles: "Go Let It Out", "Who Feels Love?" and "Sunday Morning Call". Heathen Chemistry followed in July 2002, becoming Oasis' fifth consecutive number-one album in the UK and being certified triple platinum by the BPI. Don't Believe the Truth, released in May 2005, topped the UK Albums Chart and produced the number-one singles "Lyla" and "The Importance of Being Idle". In November 2006, the band released a compilation album, Stop the Clocks, which peaked at number two in the UK and was preceded by the release of an EP of the same name. Oasis released their seventh studio album Dig Out Your Soul in October 2008; it continued the band's streak of number-one studio albums in the UK and was certified double platinum by the BPI by the end of the year. Following the release of Dig Out Your Soul and Noel Gallagher's departure from the band in August 2009, Oasis announced their break-up. In June 2010, a retrospective compilation album of the band's singles entitled Time Flies... 1994–2009 was released, peaking at number one in the UK.

Albums

Studio albums

Live albums

Compilation albums

Video albums

Extended plays

Singles

Promotional singles

Other charted and certified songs

Other appearances

Music videos

Notes

See also
 List of songs recorded by Oasis

References

External links
 Official website
 Oasis at AllMusic
 
 

Discography
Discographies of British artists
Alternative rock discographies
Rock music group discographies